The gare de Béziers (in occitan: Gara de Besièrs) is the railway station that serves the town of Béziers in the Hérault département of southern France. It is on the Bordeaux–Sète railway.

Train services
The station is currently served by the following services (2022):

High-speed services
AVE Marseille–Nîmes–Montpellier–Perpignan–Barcelona–Madrid
TGV Paris–Valence–Nîmes–Montpellier–Perpignan–Barcelona
TGV Lyon–Nîmes–Montpellier–Perpignan–Barcelona
TGV Lyon–Nîmes–Montpellier–Toulouse
Intercity services (Intercités)
Bordeaux–Toulouse–Montpellier–Marseille
Clermont-Ferrand–Millau–Béziers
Local service (TER Occitanie)
Narbonne–Béziers–Montpellier–Nîmes–Avignon
Cerbère–Perpignan–Narbonne–Montpellier–Nîmes–Avignon
Narbonne–Montpellier–Nîmes–Arles–Marseille
Saint-Chély-d'Apcher–Marvejols–Millau–Béziers

References

Railway stations in Hérault
Railway stations in France opened in 1857
Béziers